U1 is a small nuclear RNA (snRNA) component of the spliceosome and is involved in pre-mRNA splicing.

In the splicing process the 5' end of the U1 snRNA forms complementary base pairing with the 5' splice junction of the intron to be excised, thus defining the 5' donor site of an intron.

There are significant differences in sequence and secondary structure between metazoan and yeast U1 snRNAs, the latter being much longer (568 nucleotides as compared to 164 nucleotides in human). Nevertheless, secondary structure predictions suggest that all U1 snRNAs share a 'common core' consisting of helices I, II, the proximal region of III, and IV. The secondary structure model shows the structure prediction for the larger yeast sequences.

References

External links
 

Small nuclear RNA
Spliceosome
RNA splicing